Ulmus macrocarpa var. glabra Nie & Huang is restricted to mixed forests in the Chinese province of Heilongjang.

Description
The tree is distinguished by a "leaf blade subelliptic, smooth, with tufted hairs in vein axil, base oblique, apex acuminate to narrowly acuminate. Samara smooth, glabrous, wings thin. Fl. Apr.–May, fr. May.–Jun".

Pests and diseases
No information available.

Cultivation
The tree is not known to be in cultivation beyond China.

References

Elm species and varieties
Flora of China
Trees of China
Flora of Heilongjiang
Trees of Asia
Ulmus articles missing images
macrocarpa var. glabra